Mitford Hall is a Georgian mansion house and Grade II* listed building standing in its own  park overlooking the River Wansbeck at Mitford, Northumberland.

It was built in 1828 by the Mitford family to a design by architect John Dobson, to replace their old home, Mitford Old Manor House, on the opposite side of the river.

Since 1993 it has been owned by Shepherd Offshore,  the Shepherd family business run by Bruce and Freddy Shepherd.

References

External links
Keys to the Past
Owners article and photographs

Country houses in Northumberland
Grade II* listed buildings in Northumberland
History of Northumberland